Zeus is a subscription-based video streaming service launched on July 13, 2018. It was founded by social media personalities DeStorm Power, Amanda Cerny, King Bach, and television producer Lemuel Plummer, who serves as president and CEO. The service features original scripted and unscripted influencer-driven programming.

Programming

Reality (Unscripted)

 B. Simone's You're My Boooyfriend
 Joseline's Cabaret
 Life with Lil Tay
 Pretty Girls Lit
 The Real Blac Chyna
 The Real Dumbass World
 Sexy & Social: ATL
 Shirtless Cheffin' with Don Benjamin
 A Taste of Dance with Amanda Cerny
 TiTi Do You Love Me
 Tokyo Toni's Finding Love ASAP!
 Ultimate Fitness Challenge with Candice and Omar
 Your Best Life
 The Conversation
 One Mo’ Chance
 Baddies
 Bad Boys
 Doses of Draya
 Bobby I Love You, Purrr
 Baddies West
 Baddies South
 Baddies ATL

Scripted

 Adam's World
 Bad Escorts
 Dr. Blackson
 Caught
 The Cheap Negotiator
 The Cheat Seat
 Ditsy
 Ice Cream
 The Lab Rats
 Liquid Jay
 Malena ICON
 Reedo Brown Presents: Comedy Roulette
 Reedo Brown Presents: You Said That?
 Rent a Power
 The Scholarship
 Sober Coach
 Ronaldinho's Shadowplayers
 You Decide

References

External links

Video on demand services
IOS software
Android (operating system) software
Internet properties established in 2018